Jeffrey A. Beard is a retired prison official.  Beard served as Secretary of the California Department of Corrections and Rehabilitation from December, 2012 to January, 2016.  He previously served as Secretary of the Pennsylvania Department of Corrections, from 2001 until 2010.  

Beard first started working in corrections in Pennsylvania in 1972.

References

Living people
State cabinet secretaries of California
State cabinet secretaries of Pennsylvania
Year of birth missing (living people)